Andocides (Andokides; c. 440 – c. 390 BC) was a logographer (speech writer) in Ancient Greece.  He was one of the ten Attic orators included in the "Alexandrian Canon" compiled by Aristophanes of Byzantium and Aristarchus of Samothrace in the third century BC.

Life
Andocides was the son of Leogoras, and was born in Athens around 440 BC. He belonged to the ancient Eupatrid family of the Kerykes, who traced their lineage up to Odysseus and the god Hermes.

During his youth, Andocides seems to have been employed on various occasions as ambassador to Thessaly, Macedonia, Molossia, Thesprotia, Italy, and Sicily. And although he was frequently attacked for his political opinions, he maintained his ground until, in 415, he became involved in the charge brought against Alcibiades for having profaned the mysteries and mutilated the Herms on the eve of the departure of the Athenian expedition against Sicily. It appeared particularly likely that Andocides was an accomplice in the latter of these crimes, which was believed to be a preliminary step towards overthrowing the democratic constitution, since the Herm standing close to his house in the phyle Aegeis was among the very few which had not been injured.

Andocides was accordingly seized and thrown into prison, but after some time recovered his freedom by a promise that he would become an informer and reveal the names of the real perpetrators of the crime; and on the suggestion of one Charmides or Timaeus, he mentioned four, all of whom were put to death. He is also said to have denounced his own father on the charge of profaning the mysteries, but to have rescued him again in the hour of danger - a charge he strenuously denied. But as Andocides was unable to clear himself from the charge, he was deprived of his rights as a citizen, and left Athens.

Andocides traveled about in various parts of Greece, and was chiefly engaged in commercial enterprise and in forming connections with powerful people. The means he employed to gain the friendship of powerful men were sometimes of the most disreputable kind; among which a service he rendered to a prince in Cyprus is mentioned in particular.

In 411, Andocides returned to Athens on the establishment of the oligarchic government of the Four Hundred, hoping that a certain service he had rendered the Athenian ships at Samos would secure him a welcome reception. But no sooner were the oligarchs informed of the return of Andocides, than their leader Peisander had him seized, and accused him of having supported the party opposed to them at Samos. During his trial, Andocides, who perceived the exasperation prevailing against him, leaped to the altar which stood in the court, and there assumed the attitude of a supplicant. This saved his life, but he was imprisoned. Soon afterwards, however, he was set free, or escaped from prison.

Andocides then went to Cyprus, where for a time he enjoyed the friendship of Evagoras; but, by some circumstance or other, he exasperated his friend, and was consigned to prison. Here again he escaped, and after the restoration of democracy in Athens and the abolition of the Four Hundred, he ventured once more to return to Athens; but as he was still suffering under a sentence of civil disenfranchisement, he endeavored by means of bribes to persuade the prytaneis to allow him to attend the assembly of the people. The latter, however, expelled him from the city. It was on this occasion, in 411, that Andocides delivered the speech still extant "On his return", on which he petitioned for permission to reside at Athens, but in vain. In his third exile, Andocides went to reside in Elis, and during the time of his absence from his native city, his house there was occupied by Cleophon, the leading demagogue.

Andocides remained in exile until after the overthrow of the tyranny of the Thirty by Thrasybulus, when the general amnesty then proclaimed made him hope that its benefit would be extended to him also. He himself says that he returned to Athens from Cyprus, where he claimed to have great influence and considerable property. Because of the general amnesty, he was allowed to remain at Athens, enjoyed peace for the next three years, and soon recovered an influential position. According to Lysias, it was scarcely ten days after his return that he brought an accusation against Archippus or Aristippus, which, however, he dropped on receiving a sum of money. During this period Andocides became a member of the boule, in which he appears to have possessed a great influence, as well as in the popular assembly. He was gymnasiarch at the Hephaestaea, was sent as architheorus to the Isthmian Games and Olympic Games, and was even entrusted with the office of keeper of the sacred treasury.

But in 400, Callias, supported by Cephisius, Agyrrhius, Meletus, and Epichares, urged the necessity of preventing Andocides from attending the assembly, as he had never been formally freed from the civil disenfranchisement. Callias also charged him with violating the laws respecting the temple at Eleusis. The orator pleaded his case in the oration still extant "on the Mysteries" (περὶ τῶν μυστηρίων), in which he argued that he had not been involved in the profanation of the mysteries or the mutilation of the herms, that he had not violated the laws of the temple at Eleusis, that anyway he had received his citizenship back as a result of the amnesty, and that Callias was really motivated by a private dispute with Andocides over inheritance. He was acquitted. After this, he again enjoyed peace until 394, when he was sent as ambassador to Sparta regarding the peace to be concluded in consequence of Conon's victory off Cnidus. On his return he was accused of illegal conduct during his embassy. The speech "On the peace with the Lacedaemonians" (περὶ τῆς πρὸς Λακεδαιμονίους εἰρήνης), which is still extant, refers to this affair. It was delivered in 393 (though some scholars place it in 391). Andocides was found guilty, and sent into exile for the fourth time. He never returned afterwards, and seems to have died soon after this blow.

Andocides appears to have fathered no children, since he is described at the age of 70 as being childless, although the scholiast on Aristophanes mentions Antiphon as a son of Andocides. The large fortune which he had inherited from his father, or acquired in his commercial undertakings, was greatly diminished in the latter years of his life.

Oratory
As an orator Andocides does not appear to have been held in very high esteem by the ancients, as he is seldom mentioned, though Valerius Theon is said to have written a commentary on his orations. We do not hear of his having been trained in any of the sophistical schools of the time, and he had probably developed his talents in the practical school of the popular assembly. Hence his orations have no mannerism in them, and are really, as Plutarch says, simple and free from all rhetorical pomp and ornament.

Sometimes, however, his style is diffuse, and becomes tedious and obscure. The best among his orations is that "on the Mysteries"; but, for the history of the time, all are of the highest importance.

Besides the three orations already mentioned, which are undoubtedly genuine, there is a fourth against Alcibiades (κατὰ Ἀλκιβιάδου), said to have been delivered by Andocides during the ostracism of 415; but it is probably spurious, though it appears to contain genuine historical matter. Some scholars ascribed it to Phaeax, who took part in the ostracism, according to Plutarch. But it is more likely that it is a rhetorical exercise from the early fourth century BC, since formal speeches were not delivered during ostracisms and the accusation or defence of Alcibiades was a standing rhetorical theme. Besides these four orations we possess only a few fragments and some very vague allusions to other orations.

List of extant speeches
On the Mysteries ( "De Mysteriis"). Andocides' defense against the charge of impiety in the profanation of the Eleusinian Mysteries and the mutilation of the Hermae.
On His Return ( "De Reditu"). Andocides' plea for his return and removal of civil disabilities.
On the Peace with Sparta ( "De Pace"). An argument for peace with Sparta.
Against Alcibiades ( "Contra Alcibiadem"). Generally considered spurious.

Notes

Attribution

External links

Speeches at the Perseus Project

Attic orators
5th-century BC Athenians
4th-century BC Athenians
Ancient Greeks accused of sacrilege
Athenians of the Peloponnesian War
440s BC births
390s BC deaths